Indonesia were the defending champions having won the event in 2011, however they lost in the final to Thailand, 2–1.

Medalists

Draw

First round

Quarterfinals

Semifinals

Final

References

Draw

Men's Team